is a former Japanese football player.

Club statistics

References

External links

1980 births
Living people
Kokushikan University alumni
Association football people from Iwate Prefecture
Japanese footballers
J2 League players
Japan Football League players
Shonan Bellmare players
Arte Takasaki players
Tochigi SC players
Vanraure Hachinohe players
Association football defenders